Capitán Omar Darío Gerardi Airport  is a military airport located in Córdoba, Argentina.

See also

Fabrica Argentina de Aviones
List of airports in Argentina

References

External links

Airports in Córdoba Province, Argentina
Military airbases